Mil (also, Orconikidze, Ordzhonikidze) is a village and municipality in the Beylagan Rayon of Azerbaijan. It has a population of 1,975.

References

External links 

Populated places in Beylagan District